The Christian Union (CU) is a Christian-democratic political party in the Netherlands. The CU is a centrist party, maintaining more progressive stances on economic, immigration and environmental issues while holding more socially conservative positions on issues such as abortion and euthanasia. The party describes itself as "social Christian".

Founded in 2000 as a merger of the Reformed Political League (GPV) and Reformatory Political Federation (RPF), the Christian Union has five seats in the House of Representatives and four in the Senate.  After doubling its seats in the 2006 elections it became the smallest member of the fourth Balkenende cabinet. In some elections, it forms an alliance with the Calvinist Reformed Political Party (SGP), which, unlike the CU, is a testimonial party.

Primarily a Protestant party, the CU bases its policies on the Bible, and takes the theological principles of charity and stewardship as bases for its support for public expenditure and environmentalism. The party seeks for government to uphold Christian morality, but supports freedom of religion under the doctrine of sphere sovereignty. The party is moderately Eurosceptic; it was formerly with the European Conservatives and Reformists (ECR) group in the European Parliament but now sits with the European People's Party group (EPP). It is a member of the European Christian Political Movement.

History

Before 2000

The Netherlands has a long tradition of small orthodox or conservative Protestant (i.e., mostly Reformed) parties in parliament. The Reformed Political Party (SGP) entered parliament in the 1922 election as a split off from the Anti-Revolutionary Party, the Hervormd Gereformeerde Staatspartij (HGS) entered parliament in the 1925 election, a split from the Christian Historical Union. The SGP did survive the war years, but the HGS was unable to obtain seats in the 1946 elections. In 1948, the Reformed Political Alliance (GPV) split from the Anti-Revolutionary Party over a religious issue within the Reformed Churches in the Netherlands, but it took until 1963 for the party to enter parliament.  In the 1981 election, the Reformatory Political Federation (RPF) entered parliament. It had split from the ARP six years earlier over the formation of the Christian Democratic Appeal (CDA).

The RPF explicitly stated in its manifesto of principles that it sought to unite all reformed parties in the Netherlands. However, the GPV and SGP were somewhat less receptive. The GPV was only open to a specific current in reformed Protestantism, namely the Reformed Churches (Liberated), did not want to cooperate with non-'liberated' reformed: it had rejected the entry of the group that was to become the RPF in the 1970s on religious grounds. The SGP had rejected cooperation with these parties because they had female members; the SGP consistently rejected female suffrage until 2006. The RPF, GPV and SGP were testimonial parties, which chose to voice their concerns about government policy, while acknowledging that they are not big enough to force their opinion upon others.

In 1984 however the three parties cooperated in the European elections and presented a common list in order to enter the European Parliament. In the 1989 general election they formed an electoral alliance in order to enhance their chances of obtaining seats. In 1995 informal talks were opened between the three parties. The GPV had opened itself to non-liberated members, but the SGP not to women. The discussions with the SGP were broken off and the GPV and RPF continued together. For a long time the GPV was not willing to enter a major internal debate with the RPF which also performed better electorally; it had won three seats in the 1998 elections while the GPV received only two. From 1998 the two parliamentary parties cooperated with each other, held common meetings and appointed common spokespersons. In 1999 a group called "Transformatie" (Transformation) was set up by young people from both parties in reaction to the slow cooperation process: they tried to intensify the debate about cooperation. In the same year the cooperation talks were formalised and intensified, leading to the foundation of the Christian Union.

2000–present

The Christian Union was founded in January 2000 as an alliance between the RPF and GPV. Later that year, their youth organisations, GPJC and RPFJ, fused completely, presenting an example to their mother organisations. In 2001 they formed a common parliamentary party in both the House of Representatives and Senate. In 2002 the alliance entered the elections for the first time. The party got four seats - one seat less than the 1998 election when they campaigned separately. It had polled much better, with some polling stations predicting seven or eight seats. The party's leader Kars Veling stepped down. He had been good at keeping the peace internally in a party still somewhat divided along the old GPV and RPF blood lines, but had not appealed well enough to the population at large. With preference votes a woman, Tineke Huizinga (positioned no. 7 on the CU candidate-list) was elected into parliament for the CU, becoming the first woman to enter parliament for the party or its predecessors. Because of her election, prominent party figure Eimert van Middelkoop, who was no. 4 on the candidate-list, had to leave parliament. In the 2003 general election the party lost an additional seat, and was left with three seats. Again Huizinga (now no. 4 on the list) was elected with preference votes and this time former RPF leader Leen van Dijke (no. 3) had to leave parliament. The decline of the CU in 2003 was probably due to party supporters voting for the Christian-democratic CDA, which was competing with the social-democratic PvdA, to become the largest party. The Christian Union was heavily involved in the formation of Balkenende II, along with the SGP. However, the liberal People's Party for Freedom and Democracy (VVD) vetoed the formation of a cabinet that included the two conservative Reformed parties, and so the progressive liberal D66 became a part of the governing alliance instead. In 2004 the two organisations RPF and GPV officially ceased to exist, making the fusion into CU final.

In the 2006 elections the party doubled its seats and joined the fourth cabinet Balkenende. CU-leader André Rouvoet became Deputy Prime Minister and minister without portfolio for family and youth, while Middelkoop became Minister of Defence and Huizinga junior minister (staatssecretaris) of Transport and Water management. Since the party has entered government, there has been some controversy about the conservative Christian ethical views of some of its members. In 2007 Yvette Lont, a CU municipal council member for Amsterdam, expressed the view that homosexuals should not be admitted to representative functions within the party. Also in 2007, municipal council member Monique Heger decided to resign from office, because she had recently discovered that she was a lesbian, and she and her (female) partner moved in together.

After the collapse of the Balkenende cabinet, the Christian Union had no representatives in government any more and Rouvoet returned to parliament as leader of the CU parliamentary group, until he left politics in April/May 2011. Arie Slob succeeded him as the party leader.

In October 2013 the Second Rutte cabinet (VVD and PvdA), lacking a majority in the Senate, reached a budgetary agreement with the CU, the Reformed Political Party (SGP) and Democrats 66 (D66). This occasional coalition is nicknamed "purple plus the Bible" (Paars met de Bijbel) as it includes the secular parties VVD, PvdA and D66 plus the religious-orientated parties Christian Union and SGP. The term "purple plus the Bible" had already been used in February that year, when the same parties reached an agreement on modernising the housing market. Although the cabinet is quite unpopular and the VVD and PvdA lost a lot of municipal seats during the municipal elections of 19 March 2014, the parties that give tactical support to the minority government of VVD and PvdA, D66, CU and SGP won a lot of seats.

After the 2017 general election, the Christian Union became part of the Third Rutte cabinet, as a minor coalition partner to the VVD, CDA and D66. The party has three representatives in the current cabinet: minister Carola Schouten for the Ministry of Agriculture, Nature and Food Quality, Arie Slob, Minister for Primary Education, Secondary Education and Media and Paul Blokhuis, State Secretary for Health, Welfare and Sports.

Following the 2019 European elections, the Christian Union left the European Conservatives and Reformists (ECR) group in the European Parliament (of which it had been a founding member) arguing that the ECR was moving too far to the right by including MEPs far-right parties such as the Dutch Forum for Democracy and the Sweden Democrats. The party instead joined the European People's Party Group.

Ideology and issues
The CU describes itself as a Christian social party. The party has its roots in orthodox Protestant (i.e. mostly Reformed) parties, often referred to as the "small right". It combines a conservative point of view on ethical and foreign policy issues, with more centre-left ideas on economic, asylum, social and environmental issues. Its conservative reformed ideals are reflected in its program of principles. It believes that the state is the swordmaiden of God. It bases its politics directly on the Bible. However, it sees separate duties for the state and the church in public life: the church should spread the Word of God, while the state should merely uphold public morality. The state should respect the religion of its citizens. Other Christian principles, like neighbourly love and stewardship for the Earth, however have given the CU's political program a centre-left orientation.

Some of CU's conservative policies include:
 Facilitation by government of a one-earner model, allowing one parent, usually the wife, to stay at home and take care of the children.
 Society should cherish its collective moments of rest, and preferably leave Sunday a day of rest.
 Abortion and euthanasia-practices should be reduced and eventually replaced by alternatives, such as care of women with unwanted pregnancies and palliative care.
 The Dutch policy of toleration of soft drugs should be abandoned.
 Combatting child pornography and prostitution.
 Defending the freedom of education (that is, to found religious schools), because of sphere sovereignty.
 The Netherlands should remain an independent political entity within the European Union.
 Limiting the use of genetic manipulation.

More centre-left policies include:
 Public services of education, health care and social security should remain state run, but on a smaller scale than is presently the case.
 Increased budgets for development cooperation in order to address the poverty in the global south.
 A more open policy towards asylum seekers, especially those who are persecuted for religious reasons.
 A relatively green environmental policy. Based on its electoral promises on investment in green energy, the Dutch branch of Greenpeace termed CU the greenest political party.

Social issues 
The CU describes itself as "Christelijk-sociaal" (Social Christian) and explicitly distance themselves from the labels Christian socialism or Christian right. "Social Christian" describes a Christian democracy ideology that is more right-wing than Christian socialism and more left-wing than the Christian right and social conservatism. Described as centrist and Orthodox Protestant, it has an emphasis on the community, social solidarity, support for a welfare state, and support for some regulation of market forces but is more conservative on some social issues opposition to euthanasia, embryonic stem cell research, same-sex marriage, abortion and some elements of the EU. The party is left of centre on issues such as social policy, asylum policy, development aid, green environmental policy and the economy. The party supports Dutch membership of the European Union to ensure peace and prosperity, and to counter the influence of Russia and China, while simultaneously being critical of several EU policies which it claims are undemocratic and "mainly benefits large companies and the upper middle classes." The CU instead calls for more transparency within the EU, for domestic decision making of EU member states to be respected and wants reforms made to the Eurozone. The CU is also against the accession of Turkey to the European Union.

Electoral results 
This table shows the CU's results in elections to the House of Representatives, Senate, European Parliament and States-Provincial, as well as the party's political leadership: the fractievoorzitter is the chair of the parliamentary party and the lijsttrekker is the party's top candidate in the general election; these posts are normally taken by the party's leader. It also listed whether the CU was in government at the time. For further information the membership figure and the name of the party chairman of the CU are listed.

House of Representatives

Senate

European Parliament

Provincial

Since the Provincial elections of March 2015 the Christian Union has had 29 members of the States-Provincial. It is part of the provincial executives of Overijssel and Flevoland.

The following table below shows the election results of the most recent 2015 provincial election in each province. It shows the areas where the ChristenUnie is strong, namely Groningen, Overijssel, Gelderland and Flevoland, provinces which have a traditional large conservative Protestant population. The party is especially weak in the southern Catholic provinces of Limburg and North Brabant and the more secular North Holland province.

* result of combined CU/SGP lists; ** members of the CU in combined CU/SGP parliamentary parties.

Municipalities

Eight of the 414 mayors of the Netherlands are members of the CU. CU tends to have mayors in smaller rural districts in the so-called "Bible belt". This includes cities like Tholen, Staphorst and Elburg. The party cooperates in several local executives, both in the more conservative Bible Belt area, and in several larger cities like Leiden or Utrecht where the CU is a small party but needed to form a majority. It has 71 aldermen. It has 398 members of local legislatures.

Representation

Members of the cabinet 
From 2007 to 2010 the CU supplied two ministers and one state secretary in the fourth Balkenende cabinet:
 André Rouvoet, Deputy Prime Minister and Minister without portfolio for Youth and Family Affairs
 Eimert van Middelkoop, Minister of Defence
 Tineke Huizinga, State Secretary and Minister of Environment and Spatial Planning

Since 2017, the CU has once again supplied two ministers and one state secretary in the third Rutte cabinet:
 Carola Schouten, Deputy Prime Minister and Minister of Agriculture, Nature and Food Quality
 Arie Slob, Minister for Primary Education, Secondary Education and Media
 Paul Blokhuis, State Secretary for Health, Welfare and Sports

Members of the House of Representatives
After the 2021 elections the party has five representatives in the House of Representatives:
 Gert-Jan Segers, Parliamentary leader
 Mirjam Bikker
 Don Ceder
 Pieter Grinwis
 Stieneke van der Graaf

Members of the Senate
After the 2019 Senate elections, the party has four representatives in the Senate:
 Tineke Huizinga, Parliamentary leader
 Peter Ester
 Maarten Verkerk
 Hendrik-Jan Talsma

Members of the European Parliament

After the 2019 European Parliament elections, the party has one representative in the European Parliament, who sits in the European People's Party group:
 Peter van Dalen

Members of the Fourth Rutte cabinet

Electorate
The CU was supported by orthodox Reformed of many denominations, such as the Christian Reformed Churches, the Reformed Churches in the Netherlands, Reformed Churches in the Netherlands (Liberated) and the Dutch Reformed Church. But members of newer churches such as the Evangelical Church and the Pentecostal community also supported this party. The electorate is concentrated in the smaller rural districts in the so-called "Bible Belt" an area of more conservative Christian municipalities that reaches from Overijssel, through the Veluwe and the Biesbos to Zeeland. The party also draws support from Christians with an immigrant background, who are mostly located in the large cities.

The party is also drawing support from a growing number of conservative Roman Catholics, dissatisfied with the less Christian policies of the CDA. Roman Catholics are welcome to become a member of the party although one of the foundations of the party is the Heidelberg Catechism, known for its staunch anti-Catholicism. During the Provincial elections of 2007 the party fielded two Roman Catholic candidates on their shortlist of the province of Limburg. This process has alerted some prominent CDA politicians. CU-senator Egbert Schuurman stated the CU will provide a shelter for everyone who actively believes in Jesus Christ but also said the CU will always be a Protestant party.

The party's congress, held on 13 June 2015, replaced the Heidelberg Catechism with Nicean Creed.

Organisation

Leadership

 Leader in the House of Representatives
 Leen van Dijke 
 Kars Veling 
 André Rouvoet 
 Arie Slob 
 André Rouvoet 
 Arie Slob 
 Gert-Jan Segers 

 Leader in the Senate
 Egbert Schuurman 
 Roel Kuiper 
 Tineke Huizinga

Organisational structure
The highest body in the CU is the Union Congress, formed by delegates from the municipal branches. It appoints the party board and decides the order of the candidates on the lists for elections to the Senate, House of Representatives and European Parliament and has the final say over the party program. A member congress has an important role in the formation of the CU's political direction.

Members
The CU currently has 25,170 members (as of 1 January 2019). They are organised in over 200 municipal branches.

Linked organisations
The youth organisation of the party is PerspectieF which was formed as a fusion of the two youth organisations of the CU's predecessors the GPJC and RPFJ. The party publishes the HandSchrift (HandWriting) six times a year. The party's scientific institute is the Mr. Groen van Prinsterer Foundation, which publishes the DenkWijzer (ThoughtWiser). The women's organisation is Inclusief.

The CU participates in the Netherlands Institute for Multiparty Democracy, a democracy assistance organisation of seven Dutch political parties.

International organisations
Internationally the CU is a member of the European Christian Political Movement. Its MEPs where seated in the European Conservatives and Reformists group. Until 2019 when the CU joined the EPP Group

Orthodox-Protestant (pillarised) organisations
The CU still has ideological strong links with so-called pillarised organisations. Together with conservative Protestant schools, papers like the Nederlands Dagblad and the Reformatorisch Dagblad, the Protestant broadcaster Evangelische Omroep, several Reformed churches they constitute the conservative or orthodox Reformed pillar (Dutch zuil). While all four of the traditional Dutch pillars (socialists, liberals, Protestants and Catholics) have broken down since the 1960s, the orthodox reformed pillar has actually strengthened in reaction to the process of secularisation.

Relationships to other parties
The Christian Union had been in the opposition until 2006. It has good relations with the orthodox Reformed Political Party (SGP), with which it formed a single European parliamentary party CU-SGP until 2022 and the Christian Democratic Appeal, with which the ChristenUnie-SGP had an electoral alliance for the 2004 European Parliament elections. As an opposition party against the centre-right Second Balkenende cabinet, the CU has gained sympathy from the left wing parties in parliament, the Labour Party, the Socialist Party, and the GreenLeft, with which it cooperates in several local governments after the 2006 municipal elections.

International comparisons
The Evangelical People's Party of Switzerland is nearest to the Christian Union as a conservative Protestant party that is left wing in social matters, conservative in ethical matters and critical of the European Union.

Notes

References

External links

  
 Introduction (in English)
 Website of the European Christian Political Movement, of which the ChristenUnie is a member

 
Confessional parties in the Netherlands
European Conservatives and Reformists member parties
Political parties established in 2000
Political parties in the Netherlands
Protestant political parties
Eurosceptic parties in the Netherlands
Social conservative parties
2000 establishments in the Netherlands
European Christian Political Movement
Organisations based in Utrecht (province)
Conservative parties in the Netherlands
Amersfoort